Fernand Lemay (26 October 1913 – 13 May 1940) was a French road cyclist, who was professional from 1933 to 1937. He was the nephew of Fernand Lemay who was French cyclo-cross champion in 1924. He was killed during the Battle of Hannut at the beginning of World War II.

Major results 
1931
 7th Grand Prix de Fourmies
1933
 2nd Grand Prix de Fourmies

Grand Tour Results

Tour de France 
 1936: 30th

References 

1913 births
1940 deaths
French male cyclists
People from Nord-Pas-de-Calais
French military personnel killed in World War II